The women's 5000 metres event at the 2019 Summer Universiade was held on 10 and 12 July at the Stadio San Paolo in Naples.

Medalists

Results

Heats
Qualification: First 5 in each heat (Q) and next 5 fastest (q) qualified for the final.

Final

References

5000
2019